Clay Walker is the debut studio album by the American country music singer of the same name. It was released in 1993 on Giant Records and produced by James Stroud. The album produced four singles on the Billboard country music charts, of which three — "What's It to You", "Live Until I Die" and "Dreaming with My Eyes Open" — reached Number One. Respectively, these were the first, second, and fourth singles from the album. The third single, "Where Do I Fit in the Picture", peaked at #11. Additionally, "White Palace" peaked at #67 based on unsolicited airplay.

Background
After hearing about Walker, James Stroud flew down to Beaumont, Texas to meet him and see his show. After being "completely impressed", Stroud brought Walker to Nashville to record demos and then signed him to Giant and they began work on the debut album. Stroud revealed, "Clay is very consistent, and that's pretty rare in such a young act. He's one of those artists who, when he sings and you hear him going down on tape, you just know. I knew it with Clint [Black], and I could hear it with Clay." Walker explained the meeting in SUCCESS by saying, "I finished the last song, chased Stroud to his limousine and asked him if everything was OK. He said yes and that he would see me in a couple of weeks to start recording an album."

In an interview with the Los Angeles Times Walker said, "It was frustrating that I wasn't getting a contract, but I never doubted I'd eventually get one from somebody. That's because my father taught me something else too--to have incredible confidence in myself." Walker told Country Song Roundup, "The songs that I write are normally either a true life experience, or they're things that I've witnessed from other people, friends or family. When you write, you become vulnerable. If you're gonna be true to yourself and write what you really feel, that's what you have to do, you have to put down on paper exactly what you're feeling.... I make myself very vulnerable because I open up my thoughts and they could be criticized, which can be painful, or they can be accepted.

Walker was one of several musicians including Tracy Byrd and Mark Chesnutt who came from Beaumont, Texas when his debut album was released. He told The Spokesman-Review, "Beaumont is a goldmine for talent, I'll guarantee you every label in Nashville could go down there for a couple of  months and find at least four or five entertainers." Walker also stated, "I'm a lot more influenced by Haggard than anyone else. I like those powerful ballads and two-steppin music. I love swing too, but it's probably that competition thing again." Walker told the Pittsburgh Post-Gazette in addition to Merle Haggard, "My influences were Hank Williams Sr., George Jones, and Charley Pride – the kind of country my dad liked, the kind I grew up on. I'm convinced traditional country music will come back more and more. After all it's the real thing. It's honest, and it's not just a sound, it's a way of life."

Content
"What's It to You" was previously recorded by Curtis Wright, its co-writer, on his 1992 self-titled debut. "Dreaming with My Eyes Open" was also featured in the soundtrack to the 1993 film The Thing Called Love. The final track, "I Don't Know How Love Starts", was co-written by Pirates of the Mississippi member Rich Alves and was also previously recorded by Wright on his 1992 Liberty album.

Track listing

Critical reception

Geoffrey Hines of The Washington Post wrote, "The impressive debut album by Clint Black mastermind James Stroud, reveals a young man still casting about for his own style but nonetheless bringing a handsome, personal tenor and a sure rhythmic instinct to every song he tries. Offering a more promising for this youngster are the five songs he co-wrote himself; they boast the sort of lyric detail and musical build that bring out the best in his voice." Mary Jo DiLonardo of The Cincinnati Post gave the album three and a half stars out of five and wrote, "Already risking comparisons to Garth Brooks and Clint Black, Walker has a strong voice, rugged cowboy looks (a "must" for videos) and a good crop of songs." Joe Breen of The Irish Times said, "Best newcomer award goes to Clay Walker whose eponymous album sounds like it's worth checking out. Better value will be hard to find this year."

Dave Molter of the Observer-Reporter gave the album two and a half stars and wrote, "Walker's voice is clear, if not distinctive and he has the kind of chiseled good looks that might me him rise above the heard." Mia Carlson of the Lewiston Morning Tribune gave the album a favorable review and wrote, "It sounds like Giant records has put a lot of faith in this young Texan. Definitely worth a few more listens." Carlson also praised Walker's song writing as well as James Stroud's production. Jon Rawl of the Post and Courier gave the album three stars and wrote, "This album proves he may be a Walker, but he hits the ground running." Rawl also wrote, "Clay Walker sounds like a seasoned professional on this debut album."

Personnel
Eddie Bayers – drums
Larry Byrom – acoustic guitar
Jimmy Carter – bass guitar
Stuart Duncan – fiddle
Paul Franklin – steel guitar
Sonny Garrish – steel guitar
Dann Huff – electric guitar
Jana King – background vocals
Steve Nathan – piano
Bobby Ogdin – piano
Larry Paxton – bass guitar
Matt Rollings – piano
Brent Rowan – electric guitar
Leland Sklar – bass guitar
Joe Spivey – fiddle
Clay Walker – lead vocals
Lonnie Wilson – drums
Curtis Wright – background vocals
Curtis Young – background vocals

Charts and certifications
The album peaked at No. 8 on Top Country Albums on 1/29/94 and at No. 52 on The Billboard 200 on 1/22/94.

Weekly charts

End of year charts

Certifications

Singles

Other Charting Songs

References

1993 debut albums
Giant Records (Warner) albums
Clay Walker albums
Albums produced by James Stroud